Grass owl may refer to:

 African grass owl (Tyto capensis), a species of bird found in Africa
 Eastern grass owl (Tyto longimembris), a species of bird found in Asia, Australasia, and the western Pacific

Birds by common name